Manistee County Blacker Airport  is a public use airport located three nautical miles (6 km) northeast of the central business district of Manistee, a city in Manistee County, Michigan, United States. It is owned by the Manistee County Blacker Airport Authority and is mostly used for general aviation.

Until March 2012, Frontier Airlines provided service to Milwaukee (MKE), subsidized by the Essential Air Service program.  On March 15, 2012, a bid to provide Manistee County Blacker Airport with service to and from Chicago Midway International Airport was approved by the USDOT.  On May 25, 2012, the Chicago Department of Aviation announced that the route would be flown by Public Charters, Inc.

The airport is included in the Federal Aviation Administration (FAA) National Plan of Integrated Airport Systems for 2021–2025, in which it is categorized as a local general aviation facility.

History 
On Saturday, April 1, 1961, the Manistee News-Advocate reported "North Central's inaugural Flight 914," piloted by Captain Leslie C. Raatz. The aircraft was a Convair 340. Though the article does not explicitly say so, this was the first commercial flight to Manistee.

Great Lakes Airlines decided not to bid for another two-year service contract to serve as the main airline. Instead, two other airlines bid and Frontier Airlines won. On September 20, 2011, Frontier announced that it would end its service to Milwaukee on March 8, 2012. Frontier cut the route along with others to discontinue its use of smaller non-efficient planes, including the Embraer 135 that served the route from Milwaukee to Manistee.

In May 2012, Public Charters Inc. began scheduled nonstop service, operated by Aerodynamics Inc. (ADI), from Chicago Midway International Airport to and from Manistee. Initially, it provided service with the Embraer-145, a 50-seat regional jet. Public Charters temporarily suspended service in October 2012 when Aerodynamics announced that it would no longer operate the flights. Public Charters' flights at Manistee were then operated by Contour Airlines. In March 2018, Contour Airlines offered six non-stop flights per week in each direction under the name North Country Sky utilizing the Jetstream 31 and Jetstream 41 turbo-prop aircraft. Ultimate Air Shuttle replaced Contour as the operator of the flights in 2019 utilizing the Dornier 328JET after Contour retired their Jetstream aircraft.

In the summer of 2020, Cape Air was selected to replace Ultimate Air Shuttle in serving Manistee. The initial bidding process for the contract at the airport became controversial when Boutique Air, who had submitted a rival bid, accused American Airlines, itself a partner of Cape Air's, of unfairly supporting Cape Air in the bidding process. Cape Air renewed its contract for an additional two years in 2022.

In late 2022, the airport began a PFAS investigation after its energy company notified the airport it is liable for exceeding contamination levels found at a former landfill site.

Facilities and aircraft 
Manistee County Blacker Airport covers an area of 290 acres (117 ha) at an elevation of 621 feet (189 m) above mean sea level. It has two asphalt paved runways: 10/28 is 5,501 by 100 feet (1,677 x 30 m) and 1/19 is 2,721 by 75 feet (829 x 23 m).

For the 12-month period ending December 11, 2019, the airport had 5,315 aircraft operations, an average of 15 per day: 75% general aviation, 19% scheduled commercial, 5% air taxi and less than 1% military. In June 2021, there were 9 aircraft based at this airport: 8 single-engine and 1 multi-engine.

Airlines and destinations 
The following airline offers passenger service:

References

Other sources 

 Essential Air Service documents (Docket DOT-OST-1996-1711) from the U.S. Department of Transportation:
 Order 2005-5-14 (May 23, 2005): selecting Skyway Airlines, Inc., d/b/a Midwest Connect, to provide essential air service at Iron Mountain/Kingsford, Michigan, Ironwood, Michigan/Ashland, Wisconsin, and Manistee/Ludington, Michigan, for a two-year period at annual subsidy rates of $602,761, $409,242, and $776,051, respectively ($1,788,054 in total).
 Order 2007-3-21 (March 30, 2007): selecting Great Lakes Aviation, Ltd. to provide subsidized essential air service at Iron Mountain/Kingsford, Michigan, Ironwood, Michigan/Ashland, Wisconsin, Manistee/Lundington, Michigan, and Escanaba, Michigan for the two-year period beginning when the carrier inaugurates full service. The annual subsidy rates will be set at: $797,885 for Iron Mountain/Kingsford, $799,779 for Ironwood/Ashland, $957,978 for Manistee/Ludington, and $617,415 for Escanaba.
 Order 2008-4-10 (April 7, 2008): selecting Great Lakes Aviation, Ltd., to provide subsidized essential air service (EAS) at Ironwood, Michigan/Ashland, Wisconsin, and Manistee/Ludington, Michigan, utilizing 19-seat Beech 1900D aircraft at a combined annual subsidy rate of $3,292,260, for a new two-year term beginning when it inaugurates full service.
 Order 2011-1-16 (January 22, 2011): selecting Chautauqua Airlines, Inc. d/b/a Frontier Airlines, a wholly owned subsidiary of Republic Airways Holdings, Inc., to provide subsidized essential air service (EAS) at Ironwood, Michigan/Ashland, Wisconsin (Ironwood), and Manistee/Ludington, Michigan (Manistee). Service will be provided with 37-seat Embraer 135 aircraft for a two-year period beginning when the carrier inaugurates service through the end of the 24th month thereafter, at a combined annual subsidy rate of $3,082,383.
 Notice (September 9, 2011): Chautauqua Airlines, a wholly owned subsidiary of Republic Airways Holdings and doing business as Frontier Airlines, gives notice of its intent to discontinue the current service provided at Manistee, MI and Ironwood, MI, effective March 8, 2012.
 Order 2012-3-9 (March 16, 2012): selecting Service Option #2, as detailed in the Manistee County Blacker Airport Authority’s (Airport Authority) application under the Alternate Essential Air Service (AEAS) Program. The Department will enter into a Grant Agreement with the community to provide funding for regularly scheduled charter service consisting of at least 1,019 annual nonstop one-way flights between the Manistee County Blacker Airport and Chicago Midway International Airport (MDW), for a two-year period beginning when the Part 135 and/or Part 121 direct air carrier inaugurates service at the community through the end of the 24th month thereafter. By the terms of the Grant Agreement, service will be provided utilizing two-pilot, twin-engine aircraft with 30 seats for the first six months of service and with 19 seats for the remaining 18 months, at an annual rate of no more than $2,143,294 (which includes a one-time payment of $200,000 for start-up costs) for the first-year and $2,055,782 for the second year. (The Alternate EAS air service is provided through scheduled public charter flights provided by the Part 380 indirect air carrier Public Charters, Inc. and direct air carrier Corporate Flight Management. That service currently consists of 6 weekly flights between Manistee and Chicago Midway Airport on 19 seat BAE Jetstream 32 equipment.)

External links
 , official website
 
   from Michigan Airport Directory
 Aerial image as of March 1999 from USGS The National Map
 

Airports in Michigan
Essential Air Service
Transportation in Manistee County, Michigan
Buildings and structures in Manistee County, Michigan